Orekhovaya Gora is a rural locality (a selo) in Chernushinsky District, Perm Krai, Russia. The population was 404 as of 2010. There are 8 streets.

Geography 
Orekhovaya Gora is located 20 km southeast of Chernushka (the district's administrative centre) by road. Trun is the nearest rural locality.

References 

Rural localities in Chernushinsky District